Browe is a surname. Notable people with the surname include:

Robert Browe (died 1451), English politician, son of Hugh
, MP for Rutland

See also
Browne